Bear Creek  is a stream in the U.S. state of Pennsylvania. It is a tributary to the Allegheny River.

Bear Creek was so named on account of the many bears which once were seen in the area.

References

Rivers of Pennsylvania
Rivers of Armstrong County, Pennsylvania
Rivers of Butler County, Pennsylvania
Rivers of Clarion County, Pennsylvania
Tributaries of the Allegheny River